Ivan Robert Forbes (16 October 1880 – 1 December 1950) was an Australian rules footballer who played with Geelong in the Victorian Football League (VFL).

Notes

External links 

1880 births
1950 deaths
Australian rules footballers from Victoria (Australia)
Geelong Football Club players